Jakub Kosorin (born 27 April 1995) is a Slovak football forward who plays for Sokol Lanžhot in the Czech Fourth Division.

Club career
Kosorin played his first match for Senica on 26 May 2013 against Nitra.

Ahead of the 2021-22 season, Kosorin joined Sokol Lanžhot.

External links
 
 FK Senica profile
 Corgoň Liga profile

References

1995 births
Living people
Sportspeople from Senica
Slovak footballers
Slovak expatriate footballers
Association football forwards
FK Senica players
FC DAC 1904 Dunajská Streda players
FK Pohronie players
FK Hodonín players
FC Petržalka players
TJ Sokol Lanžhot players
Slovak Super Liga players
2. Liga (Slovakia) players
Czech Fourth Division players
Expatriate footballers in the Czech Republic
Slovak expatriate sportspeople in the Czech Republic